Moss Side railway station is on the Blackpool South to Preston line, in Lancashire, England. It is located in Moss Side, a hamlet where the B5259 (Lytham to Wrea Green) road crosses the railway at a level crossing. It is managed by Northern, who operate all passenger services that call there.

When the station opened in 1846, it was at first called Kirkham Road.

In 1961 Moss Side was closed along with Wrea Green station in the neighbouring (larger) village. It was an easy task to reopen the station as (unlike at Wrea Green) the platforms had never been removed after closure. Moss Side station therefore, was reopened in 1983, with the aid of a grant from Lancashire County Council.

The old station signal box was closed in the same year when the crossing over Lytham Road was automated, with the track being singled three years later.  All trains now use the old eastbound platform, with the other still intact but overgrown.

Facilities here are basic (just a waiting shelter, timetable information board and bench seats) and it is the only station on the line not to be fitted with a ticket machine to date.  The old station house is now privately owned.

Services 

Low usage has not led to reductions in service – all trains still call at Moss Side (this may be explained by the need for trains to stop for the automatic barrier crossing).

References

External links 

Railway stations in the Borough of Fylde
DfT Category F2 stations
Former Preston and Wyre Joint Railway stations
Railway stations in Great Britain opened in 1846
Railway stations in Great Britain closed in 1961
Reopened railway stations in Great Britain
Railway stations in Great Britain opened in 1983
Northern franchise railway stations
1846 establishments in England